Kenneth Iltyd Nicholl (13 February 1885 – 2 March 1952) was an English first-class cricketer active 1904–1921 who played for Middlesex and Marylebone Cricket Club (MCC). He was born in Marylebone; died in Famagusta.

References

1885 births
1952 deaths
English cricketers
Middlesex cricketers
Marylebone Cricket Club cricketers
Free Foresters cricketers
Berkshire cricketers